Kustavi (Gustaf) Grotenfelt (27 April 1861, Helsinki – 7 January 1928) was a Finnish historian, professor at the University of Helsinki and politician. He was a member of the Diet of Finland from 1888 to 1900 and from 1904 to 1906 and of the Parliament of Finland from 1908 to 1909. He represented the Young Finnish Party.

References

External links
 
 

1861 births
1928 deaths
Writers from Helsinki
People from Uusimaa Province (Grand Duchy of Finland)
Finnish people of German descent
Young Finnish Party politicians
Members of the Diet of Finland
Members of the Parliament of Finland (1908–09)
20th-century Finnish historians
University of Helsinki alumni
Academic staff of the University of Helsinki
19th-century Finnish historians